Fabio Borbottoni (1820–1902) was an Italian painter, mainly of urban vedute of Florence.

His specialty was the depiction of churches and city scenes of antique Florence, for example: the Interior of the Duomo, Interior of Santa Croce, Church of the Certosa, Interior of the Santo Spirito. He also had a predilection for painting nostalgic scenes of cityscapes that were altered in the Risanamiento of Florence, such as the Mercato Vecchio. the Ancient Porta a San Giorgio; the Porta a Pinti; Firenze dall'Erta Canina; Belvedere; and San Miniato.

Gallery

References

1820 births
1902 deaths
Painters from Florence
19th-century Italian painters
Italian male painters
20th-century Italian painters
Italian vedutisti
19th-century Italian male artists
20th-century Italian male artists